Saidash Begzy Oglu Mongush (born on August 6, 1976) is a Tuvan folk musician from Kyzyl known for his throat singing performance. He is associated with the Tuvan rock band Yat Kha and the folk group Huun Huur Tuu.

Mongush is an Honored Artist of the Republic of Tuva, Tuvan-Uryanh (Tangdy-Uraanhay), kickboxing champion of the Republic of Tuva (1993), theater and film actor.

Biography 
Born on August 6, 1976 in Old Shagaan-Aryg (or Shagonar), he spent his childhood in Chadan. In 1993, he won the kickboxing championship of the Republic of Tuva. After secondary school, he studied at a vocational school as a hairdresser and an automobile dealer.

Education 
1998–2003 Saint Petersburg State Theatre Arts Academy, graduated with honors.
2004 Tuvan State University, specialization: "Teacher of Russian language and literature" with Master grade.
He currently studies in the correspondence department as an artistic director of the Russian Academy of Theatre Arts.

Work 
In 2012, Mongush represented Tuva at the Hamag Mongol music festival in Elista.

During the Hamag Mongol project he recorded some clips showcasing his music, for example "Өдүген-Тайга". which as of January 8, 2022 has over 12 million views on YouTube.

References

People from Kyzyl
Tuvan musicians
Russian folk musicians
Throat singing
Living people
1976 births